Jeffrey Scott "Jeff" Linkenbach II (born June 9, 1987) is a former American football guard. He was signed by the Indianapolis Colts as an undrafted free agent in 2010. He played college football at Cincinnati and high school football at Margaretta High School in Castalia, OH.

Professional career

Indianapolis Colts
On September 8, 2010 Linkenbach signed with the Indianapolis Colts as an undrafted free agent. On August 29, 2011 Linkenbach was named the teams starting right tackle. On July 29, 2012 Linkenbach was moved to left guard. On March 11, 2013, the Colts tendered Linkenbach at the original-round level and on March 28 re-signed Linkenbach to a one-year. $1.323 million contract.

Kansas City Chiefs
On March 12, 2014 Linkenbach signed with the Kansas City Chiefs. The deal was a one-year $900,000 contract.

Miami Dolphins
After Linkenbach's contract with the Chiefs expired he visited the Miami Dolphins on April 21, 2015. The following day Linkenbach signed a one-year, $795,000 contract with the team. On December 16, 2015 Linkenbach was waived.

San Diego Chargers
On December 17, 2015, Linkenbach was claimed off waivers by the San Diego Chargers.

Jacksonville Jaguars
Linkenback was signed by the Jaguars. On August 29, 2016, he was placed on injured reserve.

References

External links
Miami Dolphins bio
Kansas City Chiefs bio
Indianapolis Colts bio
Cincinnati Bearcats bio

1987 births
Living people
American football offensive tackles
American football offensive guards
Cincinnati Bearcats football players
Indianapolis Colts players
Kansas City Chiefs players
Miami Dolphins players
Jacksonville Jaguars players